The Allenton Hippo is a substantive hippopotamus (Hippopotamus amphibius) skeleton that was found in Allenton, Derby, England, in 1895. It is celebrated today in a sculpture near to where the skeleton was discovered.

History
The suburb of Derby called Allenton used to be a village  from Derby. Digging of a new well at the Crown Inn in the village was undertaken in March 1895, but work stopped when the diggers discovered first a bad smell and then large and unusual bones. Several notable people agreed to fund further investigations and it was agreed that the findings should be shared with the community. Pumps were obtained and men were employed to power them in order that the hole could be dug further. These proceedings were observed by H.H. Bemrose and R.M. Deeley who later wrote an account of the digging. As agreed by the people who funded it the bones were given to Derby Museum which had then been open for sixteen years.

They eventually discovered 127 bones that came mostly from a hippopotamus, with a few belonging to rhinoceros and elephant. Arnold Bemrose took these bones as supporting evidence that Britain had a land bridge to Europe, as this was the most obvious explanation for such bones being found in England, Europe and underneath the North Sea.

The deposits have been dated to the Ipswichian Interglacial, approximately 120,000 years ago. The presence of a hippopotamus indicates that the climate was warmer than today. The winters would have no prolonged periods of frost and the average summer temperature would have been above eighteen degrees Celsius.

Later discoveries

In July 1973 workers discovered other bone fragments whilst digging in nearby Boulton Moor – some of which are also displayed in Derby Museum and Art Gallery. These excavations, for a sewer, uncovered bones from bear, deer, ox and more bones from hippopotamus, rhinoceros and elephants. These findings were just one or two bones – the best discovery was one of the largest hippo teeth found in Britain.

In 2006 Michael Dan Archer was commissioned to create a sculpture for Allenton. Discussions in Allenton revealed a desire within the community to have something that reflected the area's history. Archer's sculpture consists of three sections of a broken ring of black granite of sufficient size to form a seat. Above the polished granite surface are set cast-iron copies of bones from the hippo's skeleton. Apart from the lower jaw, which was cast from a clay model, a selection of other bones were taken from Derby Museum to Loughborough University where they were laser-scanned to create a 3D computer model. This model then allowed exact copies of the bones chosen by Archer to be cast in iron.

References

Hippopotamuses
History of Derby
Collections of Derby Museum and Art Gallery